Andromeda XXII (Pisces VI, Triangulum I) is a low surface brightness dwarf spheroidal galaxy about  away from the Sun in the constellation Pisces, of the Local Group.

Andromeda XXII is located much closer in projection to M33 than M31 [ vs. ]. This fact suggests that it might be the first Triangulum (M33) satellite ever discovered. However, it is currently catalogued as a satellite of Andromeda (M31).

The discovery arose from the first year data of a photometric survey of the M31/M33 subgrouping of the Local Group by the Pan-Andromeda Archaeological Survey (PAndAS). This survey was conducted with the Megaprime/MegaCam wide-field camera mounted on the Canada-France-Hawaii Telescope.

See also
 Low surface brightness galaxy (LSB galaxy)
 Dwarf spheroidal galaxy (dSph)
 Satellite galaxy
 Triangulum Galaxy
 Andromeda Galaxy
 Pisces constellation

References

Dwarf spheroidal galaxies
Local Group
Andromeda Subgroup
Pisces (constellation)